The Victoria Cougars were a minor professional ice hockey team based in Victoria, British Columbia. They played in the Pacific Coast Hockey League from 1949 to 1952, and they played in the Western Hockey League from 1952 to 1961.

External links
Victoria Cougars (1949–1961) at HockeyDB

1949 establishments in British Columbia
1961 disestablishments in British Columbia
Ice hockey clubs established in 1949
Ice hockey teams in British Columbia
Cougars
Western Hockey League (1952–1974) teams